Whaddon Niewoudt (born 6 January 1970) is a South African middle-distance runner. He competed in the men's 3000 metres steeplechase at the 1992 Summer Olympics. Later in his career, Niewoudt participated in road events as well; he was part of the South African team at the 2000 Chiba Ekiden marathon relay, helping the team finish in 2nd place.

References

1970 births
Living people
Athletes (track and field) at the 1992 Summer Olympics
South African male middle-distance runners
South African male steeplechase runners
Olympic athletes of South Africa
Athletes (track and field) at the 1994 Commonwealth Games
Commonwealth Games competitors for South Africa
World Athletics Championships athletes for South Africa
Place of birth missing (living people)